Molecular Ecology is a twice monthly scientific journal covering investigations that use molecular techniques to address questions in ecology, evolution, behavior, and conservation. It is published by Wiley-Blackwell. Its 2021 impact factor is 6.622. It was established in 1992 with Harry Smith as founding editor-in-chief, while Loren Rieseberg is the current editor.

See also
 Molecular Ecology Resources

References

External links

Ecology journals
English-language journals
Wiley-Blackwell academic journals
Semi-monthly journals
Publications established in 1992